The following are lists of comedians.

By nationality
List of Australian comedians
List of Australian stand-up comedians
List of Bangladeshi comedians
List of Brazilian comedians
List of British comedians
List of Canadian comedians
List of Quebec comedians
List of Dutch comedians
List of Filipino comedians
List of Finnish comedians
List of Indian comedians
List of Italian comedians
List of Japanese comedians
List of Mexican comedians
List of Nigerian comedians
List of Portuguese comedians
List of Puerto Rican comedians

Other
List of comedians
List of deadpan comedians
List of The Daily Show correspondents
List of The Daily Show writers
List of German-language comedians
List of Mad TV cast members
List of New York Improv comedians
List of stand-up comedians